Secret Files is a point-and-click adventure video game series that was originally joint developed by Fusionsphere Systems and Animation Arts before Animation Arts became the sole developer of the series. The series is published by Deep Silver.

Games

Secret Files: Tunguska (2006)

Information needed

Secret Files 2: Puritas Cordis (2008)

Information needed

Secret Files 3 (2012)

Information needed

Secret Files: Sam Peters (2013)

Information needed

Notes

References

External links
 

Deep Silver games
Embracer Group franchises
Point-and-click adventure games
Video game franchises
Video game franchises introduced in 2006